Jean-Marie Letawe (born 30 November 1936) is a Belgian footballer. He played in two matches for the Belgium national football team in 1960.

References

External links
 

1936 births
Living people
Belgian footballers
Belgium international footballers
Place of birth missing (living people)
Association footballers not categorized by position